Milton Viera Rivero (born May 11, 1946) is a former Uruguayan professional footballer who played as a midfielder. In 1975 he was called to the World XI.

Club career

Latin America
Viera took his first football steps at Nacional. He signed his first professional contract with the Uruguayan team in 1962, aged just 17. It was the year he was promoted from the youth ranks to the first team of Nacional. He remained in the team until 1968, even reaching the conquest of two Uruguayan Championships. During his time at Nacional, Viera was called up to the national team at the age of just 20. In 1968, Vieira left Uruguay and traveled to neighboring Argentina on behalf of Boca Juniors. In the club of Buenos Aires he played for just one year making a total of three appearances, failing to win a title. In 1969 he returned to Uruguay, this time on behalf of Peñarol. He played there for three years, without however managing to win a title. During his time at theclub, Vieira made intermittent very good performances, which caused the interest of several teams in both Latin America and Europe.

Olympiacos
In 1972, he left Latin America for the first time in his career and traveled to Europe, specifically Greece with destination Olympiacos. In fact, in the summer that he transferred to club of Piraeus, Julio Losada was also acquired, which made it easier for Viera to adapt to his new team. Characteristic of the fame of Viera at that time, was the fact that he was the first footballer to compete in Greece having previously participated in a FIFA World Cup. With the red and whites, he won 3 consecutive Greek championships and 2 Greek Cups including 2 domestic doubles. During the presence of Viera in Olympiacos and specifically on 26 March 1975, he alongside his teammate, Giorgos Delikaris competed in with World XI match together with Pele and Johan Cruyff. In his last season at Olympiacos, he suffered from a health problem and incorrect diagnoses by doctors at the Romanian clinic where the Piraeus management had sent him. With the intervention of his journalist friend Nikitas Gavalas, he visited a specialist doctor in Austria where he underwent a hernia operation to overcome the problem that was bothering him. Returning fully recovered to Greece, he faced the indifference of the people of the team who, taking into account his advanced footballing age of 31 years and the burden of his health adventure, released him.

AEK Athens
Upon hearing of his release from Olympiacos, the manager of AEK Athens, František Fadrhonc saw in his face the ideal solution to complete the "yellow-black" midfield, he suggested to Loukas Barlos the acquisition of Viera. Barlos, after getting the consent of the club's doctor and former president of the then HFF, Vasilis Chatzigiannis regarding the player's health, responded immediately and in the summer of 1977 Viera came to AEK. Alongside players such as Mimis Papaioannou, Thomas Mavros, Takis Nikoloudis, Christos Ardizoglou and Tasos Konstantinou, they created a spectacular team. Viera became the irreplaceable "link" that connected the defensive with the attacking function of the team sometimes enlisting the required toughness of the defender and sometimes displaying technical training of a rare virtuoso. In the two seasons he played in the "double-headed eagle", he celebrated the 2 consecutive Championships and a Greek Cup including a domestic double in 1978. A new injury in 1979 season forced him to terminate his contract with AEK and retire as a footballer. A last-ditch effort by the sports writer Giorgos Venetoulias to play one more season in the Ethnikos Piraeus was eventually fruitless.

International career
Vieira made 5 appearances, scoring once with Uruguay. He was called up for the first time in 1966 the age of just 20. It was in the 1966 FIFA World Cup tie against England, in a match where he played as a starter.

After football
Viera returned in 1979 to Uruguay, gradually developing an activity as a football manager based in Montevideo, where he lives until today having three sons. The last one which was born during his time at the AEK, was named by him the name, "Loukas" as a sing of respect and tribute to the then President of AEK, Loukas Barlos, whom he valued unimaginably and loved as his second father.

Honours

Nacional
Uruguayan Primera División: 1963, 1966

Olympiacos
Alpha Ethniki: 1972–73, 1973–74, 1974–75
Greek Cup: 1972–73, 1974–75

AEK Athens
Alpha Ethniki: 1977–78, 1978–79
Greek Cup: 1977–78

References

External links

Milton Viera at phantis.com

1946 births
Uruguayan footballers
Uruguay international footballers
Uruguayan expatriate footballers
Uruguayan Primera División players
Argentine Primera División players
AEK Athens F.C. players
Olympiacos F.C. players
Club Nacional de Football players
Peñarol players
Boca Juniors footballers
Expatriate footballers in Argentina
1966 FIFA World Cup players
Expatriate footballers in Greece
Living people
Association football midfielders